Justin de Vos (born 12 November 1998) is a Dutch football player of Curaçao descent who plays for EVV Eindhoven.

Club career
He made his professional debut in the Eerste Divisie for Achilles '29 on 21 October 2016 in a game against RKC Waalwijk.

On 26 January 2019, de Vos signed with the amateur team of FC Eindhoven, EVV Eindhoven.

References

External links
 
 

1998 births
Dutch people of Curaçao descent
Living people
Dutch footballers
Achilles '29 players
FC Lienden players
Eerste Divisie players
Tweede Divisie players
Association football defenders